Ultunafjella is a mountain ridge in Bünsow Land at Spitsbergen, Svalbard. It has a length of about seven kilometers. At the western side of the ridge is the glacier Brucebreen, and at the eastern side is Tunabreen. The ridge is named after Ultuna, Sweden.

References

Mountains of Spitsbergen